Gloria Friedmann (born 1950 in Kronach) is a German-French sculptor and installation artist.
Friedmann participated in documenta 8.

Selected works
 Existentia (1987), documenta 8, Kassel 
 Denkmal / Monument, dead tree - set into a concrete wall (1990), Essen, Germany

References

External links 
 Gloria Friedmann at kunstaspekte

German women artists
1950 births
Living people
People from Kronach (district)
German installation artists
German sculptors